The Moore–Hill House is a historic house in Peabody, Massachusetts.  It is an excellent example of a Gothic Victorian house, built in 1874 for W. H. Hill.  The -story wood-frame building has a cross gable roof line, with the main roof line running crosswise.  The front cornice, including the central front gable section, is decorated with paired brackets (a typical Italianate decoration), and the front windows have decorative surrounds.  The front door is centrally located and sheltered by an ornate entablature, above which is a round-arched window.

The house was listed on the National Register of Historic Places in 1988.

See also
National Register of Historic Places listings in Essex County, Massachusetts

References

Houses in Peabody, Massachusetts
Houses on the National Register of Historic Places in Essex County, Massachusetts
Gothic Revival architecture in Massachusetts
Italianate architecture in Massachusetts
Houses completed in 1874
History of Peabody, Massachusetts